The Irish Triple Crown Winners is a three-race competition for Thoroughbred racehorses.

The Irish Triple Crown consists of the Irish 2,000 Guineas (at 1 mile), the Irish Derby (at about 1½ miles), and the Irish St. Leger (at 1 mile and 6 furlongs).

Runners who have won all three races in one year are in bold.

Winners

1 2011 race was a dead-heat with joint winners.
2 1967 race Kingfisher finished first, but was relegated to second place upon an inquiry afterwards.
3 1953 race Premonition finished first, but was disqualified.
4 1944 race was a dead-heat with joint winners.
5 1934 race was a dead-heat with joint winners.
6 1924 race was a dead-heat with joint winners.

Bibliography
 The History of the Thoroughbred, 1978.

Horse racing in Ireland